Stefano Siglienti (1898 – 1971) was an Italian banker and politician who served as the minister of finance from 18 June until 12 December 1944. He held several banking posts until his death.

Early life and education
Hailed from intellectual bourgeois family Siglienti was born in Sassari on 17 January 1898 to Alberto Siglienti, a lawyer, and Francesca Conti. He received a law degree in 1921.

Career and activities
Following graduation from high school Siglienti began to work at a local bank in Sassari. He took part in World War I as a second lieutenant and was decorated by the King in July 1918 due to his activities in the war. He was one of the founders of the Action Party in Sardinia. From 1923 he began to work at the Sardinian Land Bank of which he would become deputy director general in 1945. In 1925 he moved to Rome and contributed to the publications, including Il Mondo and Il Becco Giallo. In 1929 he involved in the formation of Giustizia e Libertà (GL), an anti-fascist resistance movement, together with Riccardo Bauer, Ugo La Malfa and Raffaele Mattioli.

On 19 November 1943 Siglienti was arrested by the Schutzstaffel and was kept in the Regina Coeli prison. He managed to escape from the prison through the assistance of his wife, Ines, who had also been involved in the clandestine struggle against Fascist rule. Therefore, Siglienti was saved from being one of the victims of the massacre which would take place a few days later on 24 March 1944. He was appointed minister of finance in June 1944 to the cabinet led by Prime Minister Ivanoe Bonomi and was in office until December 1944.

From 1 March to 10 December 1945 he worked as the commissioner of the Banca IMI and then became its president in December 1945. The same year he was also named a member of the Consulta Nazionale. In September 1945 he was appointed president of the Italian Banking Association which he held until 1971.

Personal life and death
Siglienti married Ines Berlinguer, sister of politician Mario Berlinguer, in September 1924. They had a son and three daughters: Sergio (1926–2020), Lina, Laura and Francesca.

Siglienti died in Rome on 5 April 1971.

References

External links

20th-century Italian journalists
1898 births
1971 deaths
Action Party (Italy) politicians
Finance ministers of Italy
Italian anti-fascists
Italian bankers
Italian military personnel of World War I
Italian political party founders
Italian prisoners and detainees
Members of Giustizia e Libertà
Members of the National Council (Italy)
People from Sassari
Politicians of Sardinia